The 2018 Malaysia Cup (Malay: Piala Malaysia 2018) was the 92nd edition of Malaysia Cup tournament organised by Football Association of Malaysia (FAM). Known as the unifi Malaysia Cup due to the start of a sponsorship deal with unifi.

The 2018 Malaysia Cup began on August with a preliminary round. A total of 16 teams took part in the competition. The teams were divided into four groups, each containing four teams. The group leaders and runners-up teams in the groups after six matches qualified to the quarterfinals. 

Johor Darul Ta'zim are the title holders. They were eliminated by Terengganu in the semi-finals.

Format 
In the competition, the top eleven teams from the 2018 Malaysia Super League were joined by the top five teams from the 2018 Malaysia Premier League. The teams were drawn into four groups of four teams.

Round and draw dates 
The draw for the 2018 Malaysia Cup was held on 30 July 2018 at Damansara Performing Arts Centre on live telecast iflix with the participating team coaches and captains in attendance.

Seeding

Group stage

Group A

Group B

Group C

Group D

Bracket

Knockout stage
The first legs will be played on 21 to 25 September 2018, and the second legs will be played on 28 to 30 September 2018.

}

|}

Semi-finals 
The first legs were played on 6 and 7 October 2018, and the second legs were played on 20 and 21 October 2018.

|}

Final 

The final were played on 27 October 2018.

Statistics

Goalscorers 

Players sorted first by goals scored, then by first name.

Own goals

Hat-tricks 

4 Player scored four goals

Clean sheets

See also
2018 Malaysia FA Cup
2018 Malaysia Challenge Cup

References

External links
Football Malaysia Official Website - (Malaysia Cup)

2018 in Malaysian football
Malaysia Cup seasons
Malaysia Cup